Orange County Soccer Club was a Greater Los Angeles team active in the mid 1960s in a league called the Continental League. One of the highlights of its existence included an international match with Bayern Munich of Germany played on June 10, 1966 at Santa Ana Stadium in which the clubs played to a 3-3 tie. In 2014, local soccer supporter Blaine Jenks, a founder of an Orange County Blues FC supporter group called the County Line Coalition, discovered information of the match between OCSC and Bayern Munich.

In 1966, the Orange County Soccer Club played the final of the national tournament, the National Challenge Cup (now called the U.S. Open Cup), and played it again in 1967, but was unable to become champion on both occasions.

Known Players

The brothers Bayardo Abaunza and Manuel Abaunza, originally from Nicaragua, played for the Orange County Soccer Club in the mid 1960s as did Werner Mata.

See also
 Bayardo Abaunza
 Manuel Abaunza
 Werner Mata
 Santa Ana Stadium
 Orange County Blues FC
 History of the U.S. Open Cup
 Lamar Hunt U.S. Open Cup

References

External links
 County Line Coalition at Twitter
 County Line Coalition at Facebook

Soccer clubs in Greater Los Angeles
Sports in Santa Ana, California
Defunct soccer clubs in California